Chrudim Regional Museum (in Czech Regionální muzeum v Chrudimi) collects historical materials and artisan works related to the area around city of Chrudim, Czech Republic (Chrudimsko).

History
A museum club in Chrudim was set up in 1865. In 1892 a professional institution was established under the name "Průmyslové muzeum pro východní Čechy v Chrudimi" (Industrial museum for Eastern Bohemia in Chrudim). The museum's first building was constructed during 1897–1898, the second during 1898–1901. The first, built in Neo-Renaissance style, served for the exhibitions, the second, built in Neo-Baroque style, housed cultural actions and accessions.

Until 2003 the official name of the museum was "Okresní muzeum v Chrudimi" (Chrudim District Museum), since then it has borne the current name. An additional building on the outskirts of the city stores the deposits.

Exhibitions and activities
Most of the items kept by the museum cover history of the region. The collections are structured into:
 Archaeological collection, mostly acquired during the second half of the 19th century.
 Ethnographical material from the 16th to 20th century.
 Historical collections given from individual donators. 
 Historical library with over 17,000 volumes.
 Natural history of the area.
 Art collections.

Three permanent exhibitions cover:
 Posters by Alfons Mucha (the museum owns a unique set of 41 posters, acquired in 1898). Mucha's wife was born in Chrudim.
 Collection of local artisan works covering the turn of 19/20th century.
 History of the region in form of life-size scenes or models.

Short-term exhibits focus on local history, natural science and art. Other services are:
 Access for researchers.
 Library with 48,000 items.
 Lectures organized by the museum.
 Specialised publications.
 Journal "Chrudimské vlastivědné listy" (Chrudim Studies), issued six times a year.
 Conservational services for the archaeologists.

The museum employs 25 people (2006). It is opened year-round, except on Mondays.

External links
 Museum website (in Czech)

Museums in the Pardubice Region
Museum
History museums in the Czech Republic